Carcross Water Aerodrome  is adjacent to Carcross, Yukon, Canada on the shore of Grayling Bay on Tagish Lake. It's open from June to October and the area may be used by ski planes in the winter.

See also
Carcross Airport

References 

Registered aerodromes in Yukon
Seaplane bases in Yukon